Yacaranday  is a Mexican telenovela by TV Azteca. It premiered in 1999. The protagonists are Aylin Mujica and Jorge Luis Pila.

Cast
Aylín Mújica	... 	Yacaranday
Jorge Luis Pila	... 	Adrián 
Claudio Obregón	... 	Don Eugenio
Martha Verduzco	... 	Mercedes
Carmen Delgado	        ... 	Cecilia
Monserrat Ontiveros	... 	Rosaura
Fabiana Perzabal	... 	Berenice
Jaime Padilla        	... 	Rani
Roberto Cobo	        ... 	Tata Tomás
Farnesio de Bernal	... 	Don Luis
Paloma Woolrich	... 	Catalina
Arturo Ríos	        ... 	Omar
Claudia Lobo   	... 	Laura
René Gatica	        ... 	Teodoro
Víctor Huggo Martin	... 	Juan Santiago
Evangelina Sosa	... 	Margarita
Marta Zamora	        ... 	Leonor
Myrrah Saavedra	... 	Otilia
Claudette Maillé	... 	Marcela
Abel Woolrich   	... 	Lucio
Carlos Cobos	        ... 	Padre Domingo
Guillermo Iván  	... 	Timoteo
Úrsula Murayama

Crew

References

1999 telenovelas
1999 Mexican television series debuts
1999 Mexican television series endings
Mexican telenovelas
TV Azteca telenovelas
Spanish-language telenovelas